Ekaterina Sergeevna Ananina (born 31 January 1982) is a badminton player from Russia. She was the women's doubles champion at the National Championships in 2002 and 2009. Now, she was known as Ekaterina Vikulova. Ananina was prepared to compete at the Beijing 2008 Olympic Games, but she was failed to qualified.

Achievements

BWF Grand Prix 
The BWF Grand Prix has two levels: Grand Prix and Grand Prix Gold. It is a series of badminton tournaments, sanctioned by Badminton World Federation (BWF) since 2007. The World Badminton Grand Prix has been sanctioned by the International Badminton Federation since 1983.

Women's doubles

 BWF Grand Prix Gold tournament
 BWF & IBF Grand Prix tournament

BWF International Challenge/Series
Women's singles

Women's doubles

 BWF International Challenge tournament
 BWF International Series tournament
 BWF Future Series tournament

References

External links
 

Living people
Russian female badminton players
1982 births
Sportspeople from Perm, Russia
21st-century Russian women